Air Traffic Controller is an indie pop band that started in Boston, Massachusetts.

The lead singer, singer/songwriter Dave Munro, had previously served in the United States Navy as an air traffic controller, inspiring the name for the band. While he was serving in the navy, he sent home demos from his music and later met singer/songwriter Casey Sullivan.

Reception 
The band was a 2015 Billboard Hot 100 Fest performer. Additionally, they have over 15 million Spotify plays. They were selected as a Showcase Artist for SXSW 2016 and made the NPR Hot 100 List for SXSW. They have also been featured a 'New Band of the Week' in The Guardian. They have also been featured in multiple Guardian and Boston Globe articles. Their first album, The One, was nominated for MTV's "Best Breakout Artist" award in 2009. Their song, "People Watching," is featured in EA SPORTS NHL 17. In 2016, they won the Independent Music Award in the categories of Best Indie/Alt. Rock Album (Black Box), Best Music Producer (Bleu, also on Black Box) and Best Indie/Alt. Rock song ("The House").

Discography

Albums
 The One - December 8, 2009
 NORDO - June 26, 2012
 Black Box - March 11, 2016
 Echo Papa (EP) - June 23, 2017
 Dash - November 11, 2022

Singles 
 "Sometimes" - August 25, 2020
 "After Party" - May 12, 2017
 "The House" - July 28, 2016
 "People Watching" - April 14, 2015
 "On the Wire" - May 26, 2015

Awards and nominations

Independent Music Awards

|-
| 2016
| Black Box
| Best Indie/Alt. Rock Album
| 
|-
| 2016
| "The House"
| Best Indie/Alt. Rock Song 
| 
|-
| 2016
| Bleu - Black Box
| Best Music Producer
| 
|-
| 2016
| "The House"
| Best Video
| 
|-
| 2018
| "Echo Papa"
| Best EP - Rock
|

References 

Indie pop groups from Massachusetts
Musical groups from Boston